David Edwin Moe (born June 10, 1964) is an American basketball coach, most recently serving as the head coach at Emporia State University from 2001 to 2011. Prior to coaching at Emporia State, Moe has been an assistant coach in the National Basketball Association (NBA), as well as the NCAA Division I.

Biography
Moe, born June 10, 1964, is the son of former NBA coach, Doug Moe. After graduating high school, Moe played two seasons at Catawba College in North Carolina, before transferring to Texas Lutheran University in Texas. In 1987, a year after Moe graduated from college, Moe left for the University of Kansas where he spent a season as a graduate assistant on the 1988 championship team. After a year in Kansas, Moe left to become an assistant coach at Texas Tech University for three years. In 1991, Moe became a regional scout for the Denver Nuggets and Charlotte Hornets. In the 1992 season, Moe was an assistant coach for the Philadelphia 76ers. From 1993 to 2001, Moe served as the assistant coach for the University of Colorado Boulder.

Personal life
Moe and his wife, Cristi, have three children.

Coaching career
On March 27, 2001, Moe was named the 16th head men's basketball coach at Emporia State University. During his tenure at Emporia State, Moe was known for having a temper. During the 2003–04 season, Moe led the Hornets to a 22–6 record and finished ranked 22nd in the nation, leading the team to its first-ever NCAA Tournament postseason appearance. In December 2007, Moe was suspended for one game due to getting thrown out of a home game and knocking over the opposing team's water cooler at William L. White Auditorium. Moe stepped down at the end of the 2011 season to move to Delaware where his wife and children live.

Head coaching record

References

1964 births
Living people
Centers (basketball)
Catawba Indians men's basketball players
Colorado Buffaloes men's basketball coaches
Emporia State Hornets basketball coaches
Kansas Jayhawks men's basketball coaches
Philadelphia 76ers assistant coaches
Texas Lutheran University alumni
Texas Tech Red Raiders basketball coaches
People from Burlington, North Carolina
American men's basketball players
Basketball coaches from North Carolina
Basketball players from North Carolina